Ivana Mišura (born 1989) is a Croatian model and beauty pageant titleholder who was crowned Miss Universe Hrvatske 2014. She represented her country in the Miss Universe 2014 pageant.

Early life
Ivana Mišura works as a model in Zagreb, Croatia.

Pageantry

Miss Universe Hrvatske 2014
Mišura was crowned as Miss Universe Hrvatske 2014, held at the Marina Cvetkovića Sports Complex in the coastal resort town of Opatija.

Miss Universe 2014
Mišura competed at the Miss Universe 2014 but Unplaced.

References

External links
Official Miss Universe Hrvatske website

Miss Universe 2014 contestants
Croatian beauty pageant winners
Living people
1989 births